Isotrias stramentana is a species of moth in the family Tortricidae. It is found in Spain, France, Italy, Switzerland and Germany.

The wingspan is 14–17 mm. Adults are on wing from May to July and again in September.

References

Polyorthini
Moths described in 1845
Moths of Europe
Taxa named by Achille Guenée